A louse is a wingless insect. 

Louse may also refer to:

Infections
 Pediculosis, an infection caused by lice
 Pediculosis capitis (Head lice infestation)
 Pediculosis corporis (Pediculosis vestimenti, Vagabond's disease)
 Pediculosis pubis (Crabs)

Insects and other arthropods
 Gill louse, Ergasilus, a genus of parasitic copepod crustaceans
 Hog louse (disambiguation)
 Sea louse, the Caligidae, a family of ectoparasitic marine copepods
 Whale louse, the Cyamidae, a family of parasitic amphipod crustaceans
 Woodlouse, the Oniscidea, a suborder of terrestrial isopod crustaceans

Other uses
 Stone louse, a fictitious animal created by the humorist Loriot

See also
 Laos
 Louse Creek (disambiguation)
 Mouse (disambiguation)